This is a list of the 16 members of the European Parliament for Finland in the 1999 to 2004 session.

List

Party representation

Notes

External links
Elected Finnish Members of European Parliament in European Parliament elections 1999 (in English)

Finland
List
1999